Isabelle Pasquet (born March 8, 1962) is a member of the Senate of France, representing the Bouches-du-Rhône department.  She is a member of the Communist, Republican, and Citizen Group.

References
Page on the Senate website

1962 births
Living people
French Senators of the Fifth Republic
Women members of the Senate (France)
21st-century French women politicians
Senators of Bouches-du-Rhône
Place of birth missing (living people)